Artavious Courtez Smith (born May 3, 1980), better known by his stage name Tay Dizm, is an American rapper and hype man best known for being signed to T-Pain's Nappy Boy Entertainment record label.

Biography
Smith spent his entire childhood raised in foster homes before finding his biological family in Miami, Florida. His two brothers taught him how to rap and recorded mixtapes with him. He moved to Tallahassee, Florida, where he met singer T-Pain, for whom Smith would become a hypeman. Under stage name Tay Dizm, Smith did guest performances on tracks from T-Pain's first three albums.

Dizm is the first artist to release an album under T-Pain's Nappy Boy Digital label. He has appeared on the singles "Who the Fuck is That?" by Dolla and "She Got It" by 2 Pistols, which charted on the Billboard Year-End Hot 100 singles of 2008. On August 19, 2008, Dizm released his debut single, "Beam Me Up," featuring T-Pain and Rick Ross, which was released online via Nappy Boy Digital. It quickly sold 4,000 downloads, according to Nielsen SoundScan, without significant promotion. He is featured in all three of T-Pain's solo albums.

The second single, "Dream Girl", features Akon and charted on the Billboard Bubbling Under Hot 100 chart in February 2009. It was featured on Dizm's album, Welcome to the New World. The album's third single, "Nothing But The Truth", original version featured Atlanta rapper Dolla a Picallo. The album version features Picallo and Young Cash. Single "Club Pack" was released on MTV on February 20, 2013.

Discography

Albums 
 TBA: Welcome to the New World

Extended plays 
 TBA: The Tempataions [sic?]

Mixtapes 
 2007: Tha Hottest Hotboy
 2009: Dreamgirl
 2010: Point 'Em Out
 2011: Thank You For Being A Friend
 2012: ART

Singles 
2007: "Like Me" (Feat. Lil Wayne)
2008: "Beam Me Up" (Feat. T-Pain & Rick Ross)
2009: "Dreamgirl" (Feat. Akon)
2009: "Nothing But the Truth" (Feat. Young Cash & Piccalo)
2012: "Getting to the Money"  (Feat. T-Pain & J-Bo)
2013: "Club Pack" (Feat. Young Cash)
2014: "Pop It" (Feat. Young Cash)
2016: "Good Lil Bit" (Feat. T-Pain & Krayzie Bone)

References

External links
Official website

1980 births
Living people
African-American male rappers
Jive Records artists
RCA Records artists
Musicians from Tallahassee, Florida
Rappers from Florida
Singers from Florida
21st-century American singers
21st-century American rappers
21st-century American male singers